The Boomerang Book of Legendary Tales (1957) is an anthology of indigenous myths and legends for children, compiled by Australian author Enid Moodie Heddle, illustrated by Nancy Parker. It won the Children's Book of the Year Award: Older Readers in 1957.

Plot outline

This anthology contains a selection of Australian Aboriginal legends, and myths from New Zealand, Fiji, New Guinea, Tonga, Borneo, Micronesia and the Solomon Islands.

Critical reception

In a survey of possible Christmas book gifts for children in The Age in 1957, Dennis Dugan noted: "Miss Moodie Heddle has drawn on the work of such writers as Mrs. Langloh Parker, Mervyn Skipper, Roland Robinson, Eve Grey, Dal Stivens and Lance Skuthorpe for this excellent collection."

See also
 1957 in Australian literature

References

Australian children's books
Australian folklore
Australian Aboriginal mythology
1957 children's books
Collections of fairy tales
CBCA Children's Book of the Year Award-winning works